Bridging the Gap is the fourth and final solo studio album by American musician Roger Troutman. It was released on October 29, 1991, via Reprise Records. The production was handled by David Gamson and Troutman.

Critical reception

The Indianapolis Star wrote: "Variations on Roger's fourth solo disc are interesting but mostly unoriginal, saluting Zapp's roots in the P-Funk movement."

Track listing

Personnel
Roger Troutman – lead vocals, backing vocals, talkbox, keyboards, synthesizer, lead guitar, rhythm guitar, bass, drum programming, editing, mixing, recording, arrangement, producer

Dale DeGroat – backing vocals, keyboards, synthesizer, editing, engineering
Terry Troutman – backing vocals, keyboards, editing, engineering
Sherman Fleetwood – backing vocals, engineering
Dick Smith – backing vocals
Nicole Cottom – backing vocals
Otis Stokes – backing vocals
Rocque LaCrosby – backing vocals
Shirley Murdock – backing vocals
David Gamson – keyboards, synthesizer, bass, drum programming, recording, arrangement, producer (tracks: 1-2, 4-6)
Lester Troutman – percussion, drum programming, editing, mixing, engineering
Paulinho da Costa – percussion
Tony Alvarez – drum programming
Carl Cowen – horns
Robert Smith – engineering
Rufus Troutman III – engineering
Anthony "Sir Jinx" Wheaton – additional co-producer (track 1)
Larry Troutman – arrangement (track 10)
John Potoker – mixing (track 1)
Goh Hotoda – mixing (tracks: 2, 4, 6)
Warren Woods – additional recording (track 1)
Ryan Dorn – additional recording (track 6)
Steve Hall – mastering
Kevin Hosmann – art direction
Alan Snow – photography
Marsha Burns – coordinator
Benny Medina – executive producer

Charts

References

External links

Roger Troutman albums
1991 albums
Reprise Records albums